Klaus Bittner (born 23 October 1938) is a retired German rower who won two Olympic medals for the United Team of Germany: a gold and a silver in the eights in 1960 and 1964, respectively. He also won four European titles in fours and eights between 1959 and 1964.

References

1938 births
Living people
Olympic rowers of the United Team of Germany
Rowers at the 1960 Summer Olympics
Rowers at the 1964 Summer Olympics
Olympic gold medalists for the United Team of Germany
Olympic silver medalists for the United Team of Germany
Olympic medalists in rowing
West German male rowers
Medalists at the 1964 Summer Olympics
Medalists at the 1960 Summer Olympics
People from Görlitz
European Rowing Championships medalists
Sportspeople from Saxony